The 1979 IAAF World Cross Country Championships was held in Limerick, Ireland, at the Greenpark Racecourse on 25 March 1979. A report on the event was given in the Glasgow Herald.

Complete results for men, junior men, women, medallists, 
 and the results of British athletes were published.

Medallists

Race results

Senior men's race (12 km)

Note: Athletes in parentheses did not score for the team result

Junior men's race (7.36 km)

Note: Athletes in parentheses did not score for the team result

Senior women's race (5.04 km)

Note: Athletes in parentheses did not score for the team result

Medal table (unofficial)

Note: Totals include both individual and team medals, with medals in the team competition counting as one medal.

Participation
An unofficial count yields the participation of 383 athletes from 27 countries.  This is in agreement with the official numbers as published.

 (11)
 (7)
 (21)
 (20)
 (1)
 (21)
 (21)
 (21)
 (21)
 (4)
 (21)
 (1)
 (11)
 (15)
 (21)
 (11)
 (6)
 (13)
 (21)
 (16)
 (21)
 (5)
 (7)
 (6)
 (20)
 (21)
 (19)

See also
 1979 IAAF World Cross Country Championships – Senior men's race
 1979 IAAF World Cross Country Championships – Junior men's race
 1979 IAAF World Cross Country Championships – Senior women's race
 1979 in athletics (track and field)

References

External links 
The World Cross Country Championships 1973-2005
GBRathletics

 
World Athletics Cross Country Championships
C
International athletics competitions hosted by Ireland
C
C
Athletics in the Republic of Ireland
Cross country running in Ireland
IAAF World Cross Country Championships